Chevy Chase is a neighborhood in southeastern Lexington, Kentucky, United States. Its boundaries are Cooper Drive to the south, Tates Creek Road to the west, Fontaine Road to the north, and Chinoe Road to the east.

Name origin
Chevy Chase was named after a golf club in Maryland that the subdivision's founder, Henry Clay Simpson, joined while working in Washington, D.C. in the 1920s.

Neighborhood statistics

 Area: 
 Population: 1,026
 Population density: 3,973 people per square mile
 Median household income: $61,924

References

External links
Chevy Chaser Magazine

Neighborhoods in Lexington, Kentucky